Spring Airlines Co., Ltd. is a low-cost carrier with its headquarters in the Homeyo Hotel in Changning District, Shanghai, China. While the company adopted the English name "Spring Airlines", the Chinese name literally means "Spring Autumn Airlines".

Spring Airlines is the aviation subsidiary of Shanghai Spring International Travel Service. It reported a net profit of 950 million yuan ($143 million) in 2016.

History and development 

The airline was given approval to be established on 26 May 2004. Its first aircraft, an Airbus A320 (formerly of Lotus Air), was delivered on 12 July 2005, at Shanghai Hongqiao International Airport. Spring Airlines started operations on 18 July 2005 and the first flight on that day was between Shanghai and Yantai. Daily flights to Guilin were also initiated.

To keep operating costs low, Spring sells tickets exclusively from its ch.com website (and some designated ticket offices), bypassing travel agents.  Spring no longer offers complimentary on-board meals nor complimentary water; however passengers are able to purchase meals and beverages on board. In December 2006, the airline offered a 1-yuan promotional price which caused trouble with government officials.

In late July 2009, Spring's plan to establish overseas routes was granted by the General Administration of Civil Aviation of the People's Republic of China, making it the first budget airline in China to explore the international market. The airline had plans to operate short-distance routes linking mainland Chinese cities to Hong Kong and Macau, as well as neighboring countries such as Japan, South Korea, Cambodia, Singapore, Vietnam and Thailand.

On July 29, 2010, Spring Airlines launched its first international route linking its home city Shanghai and Japan's Ibaraki Airport, about 80 kilometers northeast of Tokyo. 2 months later, on September 28, the airline successfully introduced its first flight from Shanghai to Hong Kong with almost full passengers on board. Spring's daily flights from Shanghai to Macau commenced on 8 April 2011 with further international destinations following in the second half of 2011.

Since January 2015, the company has been listed on the Shanghai Stock Exchange.

Spring Airlines also operates a subsidiary in Japan and is the first Chinese airline to do so.

Destinations

Fleet 
, the Spring Airlines fleet consists of the following aircraft:

Accidents and incidents 
On June 6, 2014, at Xiamen Airport, an Airbus A320 operated by Spring Airlines experienced a runway excursion on the right side of the runway and struck a runway light. The pilot then attempted to go around, causing a tail strike. There were no injuries, but the aircraft sustained substantial damage. An investigation was conducted by China's Accident Investigation Board.

References

External links 

 

Airlines of China
Airlines established in 2004
Chinese companies established in 2004
Low-cost carriers
Companies based in Shanghai
Privately held companies of China
Chinese brands